Aldo Donati (29 September 1910 – 3 November 1984) was an Italian footballer who played as a midfielder.

Club career
Born in Bologna, he played in the 1930s for Bologna and Roma. He played 201 matches in Serie A and scored 4 goals. He debuted in Serie A at 19 years of age and played for eight seasons for Bologna winning the scudetto in 1936 and 1937, as well as the Mitropa Cup. The following year he was acquired by Roma where he played seven seasons. In 1942 he won his third scudetto (Roma's first) before retiring. After the Second World War, he later also played a season with Inter between 1945–46.

International career
For the Italy national football team he was selected to the 1938 FIFA World Cup-winning squad as a reserve player, although he never made his debut for Italy.

Honours

Club
Bologna
Serie A: 1935–36, 1936–37
Mitropa Cup: 1932, 1934

Roma
Serie A: 1941–42

International
Italy
FIFA World Cup: 1938

References

External links
 Article noting the death of Addio Rava, the last surviving 1938 World Cup player from Italy, in La Gazzetta dello Sport

1910 births
Bologna F.C. 1909 players
Footballers from Bologna
Italian footballers
Association football midfielders
Serie A players
A.S. Roma players
Inter Milan players
1938 FIFA World Cup players
FIFA World Cup-winning players
Year of death missing